Boaz Janay (בועז ינאי; also Yanai; born November 9, 1952) is an Israeli former basketball player. He played the center position. He scored 6,752 career points, 4th-most in Israel Basketball Premier League history.

Biography
Janay is 1.99 m tall.

He played for Hapoel Gvat/Yagur, Hapoel Tel Aviv, and Hapoel Gilboa/Afula in 16 seasons between 1972 and 1989. In his career, Janay scored 6,752 points, 4th-most in Israel Basketball Premier League history.

In the 1977 Maccabiah Games, he won a silver medal with Team Israel.

He played for the Israeli national basketball team.  He played in the 1971 FIBA European Championship for Men, 1972 European Olympic Qualifying Tournament for Men, 1973 FIBA European Championship for Men, 1975 FIBA European Championship for Men, 1976 European Olympic Qualifying Tournament for Men, 1977 FIBA European Championship for Men, 1979 FIBA European Championship for Men, 1980 European Olympic Qualifying Tournament for Men, and 1981 FIBA European Championship for Men.

References

External links
למטרה: כדורסלן העבר מסביר מה חסר היום לנבחרת, Maariv, February 18, 2015.

Israeli men's basketball players
Hapoel Gilboa/Afula players
Hapoel Tel Aviv B.C. players
Israeli Basketball Premier League players
Medalists at the 1974 Asian Games
Asian Games gold medalists for Israel
Asian Games medalists in basketball
Basketball players at the 1974 Asian Games
Centers (basketball)
1952 births
Living people
Competitors at the 1977 Maccabiah Games
Jewish men's basketball players
Maccabiah Games basketball players of Israel
Maccabiah Games silver medalists for Israel